Bankin may refer to:

John Bankin (14th century), English churchman
Bankin, Iran, a village in East Azerbaijan Province, Iran